Agnee is a Bangladeshi action film directed by Iftakar Chowdhury and produced by Abdul Aziz under the banner of Jaaz Multimedia banner. It is a remake of French film Colombiana which was released in 2011. The film features Arifin Shuvoo and Mahiya Mahi in the lead roles and Misha Sawdagor, portraying the main antagonist of the film. The film is about Tanisha, a nine-year-old girl in Dhaka whose family is killed by underworld mafia Gulzar and Haydar. Fifteen years later, a 24 year old Tanisha has become an accomplished assassin. Even though both of the killers are now under protection of the government of Thailand and are guarded by a very powerful group, led by Dragon (Arifin Shuvoo), Tanisha uses every means at her disposal to find where Gulzar and Haydar are hiding and avenge her family's death.

Agnee was released on 14 February 2014 in Bangladesh.  The film was a huge financial success as it eventually become one of the Highest grossing Bangladeshi films of 2014. The sequel of the film titled Agnee II was released in 2015.

Plot
Tanisha is a young daughter of a man working for the brutal underworld mafia Gulzar and Haydar. When Tanisha's father decides he wants to leave the crime world to make a better life for his daughter, Gulzar and Haydar kills him, and family in order to eliminate a potential threat. Gulzar kills everyone in the family, and when he is about to kill Tanisha, she stabs him and vows she will kill them one day before escaping. She grows up to be a stone-cold assassin. She receives training from her uncle and ultimately engages in vigilante murders that she hopes will lead her to her ultimate target, the powerful underworld crime syndicate responsible for her parents' death.

Cast

 Mahiya Mahi as Tanisha
 Arifin Shuvoo as Shishir / Dragon  
 Ali Raj as Gulzar
 Misha Sawdagor as Haidar
 Kabila as Mama
 Danny Sidak as Marshal
 Iftakar Chowdhury as Kamal Ali
 Don as Kibriya
 Shiba Shanu as Alamgir
 Puja Cherry as Young Tanisha
 Nil Ahmed as Gause
 Daisy as Daisy
 May as Sukhi

Production

Development
During mid 2013, Jaaz Multimedia announced the project with Mahiya Mahi as the main lead and Iftakar Chowdhury as the director. It was later announced that Arifin Shuvoo will join the cast as the main male lead.

Soundtrack
The film's soundtrack is composed by Adit, Shafiq Tuhin, Ahmed Humayan and with lyrics penned by Ahmed Imtiaz Bulbul, Robiul Islam Jibon, Abdul Aziz and Sudip Kumar Dip.

Sequel
Director Iftakar Chowdhury has made a sequel, Agnee 2. The film released in 2015.

References

Further reading

External links
 

2014 films
2014 crime thriller films
Bengali-language Bangladeshi films
Bangladeshi crime thriller films
Bangladeshi remakes of foreign films
2010s Bengali-language films
2010s vigilante films
Bangladeshi films about revenge
Jaaz Multimedia films